Ivars Bērzups (born 19 January 1963) is a Latvian former bobsledder and businessman. He competed at the 1984 Winter Olympics and the 1988 Winter Olympics, representing the Soviet Union, and at the 1992 Winter Olympics, representing Latvia. In the 2009 Latvian municipal elections, he ran in the Babīte County Council elections as a member of Demokrāti.lv, but was not elected.

References

External links
 

1963 births
Living people
Latvian male bobsledders
Olympic bobsledders of Latvia
Olympic bobsledders of the Soviet Union
Bobsledders at the 1984 Winter Olympics
Bobsledders at the 1988 Winter Olympics
Bobsledders at the 1992 Winter Olympics
People from Valmiera